Curtis Wynter (born 24 June 1991) is an English footballer who plays as a defender. He plays for Romulus.

Career
Wynter started his career at Coventry City where he made his professional debut as right back on 3 January 2009 in a 2–0 FA Cup win against Kidderminster Harriers. He made his league debut two weeks later in a game against Blackpool.

At the end of the 2009/2010 Coventry City told Wynter he was surplus to requirements and he was subsequently released.

After being released Wynter had an unsuccessful trials with Bournemouth, Accrington Stanley, Tranmere Rovers and Kidderminster Harriers.

In October 2010, he signed for Spanish side Jerez Industrial who are owned by Glenn Hoddle as part of his Academy project. He made 16 appearances for Jerez.

In March 2012 he signed for Romulus.
He also now works at aspire sports in Wolverhampton

References

External links

1991 births
Living people
Footballers from Birmingham, West Midlands
English footballers
Association football defenders
Coventry City F.C. players
Jerez Industrial CF players
Romulus F.C. players
Hayes & Yeading United F.C. players
English Football League players
Tercera División players
British expatriates in Spain
Expatriate footballers in Spain